"Dragged into the Grave" is a song by American deathcore band Carnifex. It was released as the first single from their fifth album Die Without Hope through Nuclear Blast Records on January 16, 2014 as a digital release available on iTunes.

Track listing

Personnel 
 Carnifex
 Scott Lewis – lead vocals
 Fred Calderon – bass
 Cory Arford – rhythm guitar, backing vocals
 Jordan Lockrey – lead guitar
 Shawn Cameron – drums, keyboards

References

External links 
 

2014 singles
2014 songs
Carnifex (band) songs
Nuclear Blast Records singles
Deathcore songs